Ekarerina Avramova may refer to:

Ekaterina Avramova (politician), Bulgarian politician who was one of the first group of women in the National Assembly
Ekaterina Avramova (swimmer), Bulgaria-born swimmer